Marden Henge (also known as Hatfield Earthworks) is the largest Neolithic henge enclosure discovered to date in the United Kingdom. The monument is northeast of the village of Marden, Wiltshire, within the Vale of Pewsey and between the World Heritage Sites of Avebury and Stonehenge.

Description
The enclosure is roughly oval in shape, and is enclosed by a typical bank and internal ditch arrangement constructed on the east, north and north-west sides and by the River Avon to the south and west. Antiquarian accounts of the site describe a huge mound within the enclosure called Hatfield Barrow, which collapsed after excavation by William Cunnington in the early 19th century. Today, Marden Henge has been damaged by ploughing, and no longer has any standing stones.

Around 1 kilometre to the south, archaeologists have detected the presence of another henge known as Wilsford Henge.

Archaeology
The area was designated as a scheduled monument in 1953. The site was excavated by Geoff Wainwright in 1969; he excavated the north entrance and found a timber circle, and Grooved ware pottery, similar to Durrington Walls.  The finds are at Wiltshire Museum in Devizes, where there is also a small display.

In 2010, the henge and surrounding area were investigated through aerial, geophysical, and field survey. During the dig, a Neolithic building was discovered, described as the best preserved Neolithic building in England.

The site is included in a three-year investigation of the Pewsey Vale, beginning in 2015, by the Department of Archaeology at the University of Reading.

References
Notes

Bibliography

External links

Hatfield Earthworks (Marden Henge) at English Heritage
Marden Henge at English Heritage Research
Hatfield Barrow – Cunnington's description of the excavations at Wiltshire Museum
Blog entry highlighting the Marden excavation finds on the website of Wiltshire Museum

2nd-millennium BC architecture
Buildings and structures in Wiltshire
English Heritage sites in Wiltshire
History of Wiltshire
Ruins in Wiltshire
Scheduled monuments in Wiltshire
Stone Age sites in England
Neolithic settlements
Tourist attractions in Wiltshire
Archaeological sites in Wiltshire
Henges